Codeminion is a Polish video game developer based in Warsaw. Founded in 2004, Codeminion primarily builds downloadable casual games, with Magic Match being their biggest commercial success to date. Magic Match is now the property of Oberon Games and has spawned several sequels.

Games
Pteroglider (2004)
Magic Match (2005)
StoneLoops! of Jurassica (2008)
Ancient Quest of Saqqarah (2008)
Brunhilda and the Dark Crystal (2010)
Phantasmat (2011)

References

External links
 Codeminion
 StoneLoops! of Jurassica official website
 Ancient Quest of Saqqarah official website
 Brunhilda and the Dark Crystal official website
 Phantasmat official website

Video game development companies
Video game companies established in 2004
Polish companies established in 2004
Video game companies of Poland
Companies based in Warsaw